Allentown High School is a public high school that serves students in ninth through twelfth grades from three communities in Monmouth County, New Jersey, United States, operating as part of the Upper Freehold Regional School District. The school serves students from Allentown Borough and Upper Freehold Township. Millstone Township sends students to the district's high school as part of a sending/receiving relationship. The school has been accredited by the Middle States Association of Colleges and Schools Commission on Elementary and Secondary Schools since 1959.

As of the 2021–22 school year, the school had an enrollment of 1,131 students and 81.4 classroom teachers (on an FTE basis), for a student–teacher ratio of 13.9:1. There were 36 students (3.2% of enrollment) eligible for free lunch and 12 (1.1% of students) eligible for reduced-cost lunch.

The district participates in the Interdistrict Public School Choice Program at Allentown High School, having been approved on November 2, 1999, as one of the first ten districts statewide to participate in the program. Seats in the program for non-resident students are specified by the district and are allocated by lottery, with tuition paid for participating students by the New Jersey Department of Education.

History
Students from Plumsted Township had attended the high school as part of a sending/receiving relationship with the Plumsted Township School District prior to the passage of a referendum under which New Egypt High School was opened in September 2001 with an initial class of 100 students in ninth grade.

Awards, recognition and rankings
The school was the 125th-ranked public high school in New Jersey out of 339 schools statewide in New Jersey Monthly magazine's September 2014 cover story on the state's "Top Public High Schools", using a new ranking methodology. The school had been ranked 135th in the state of 328 schools in 2012, after being ranked 82nd in 2010 out of 322 schools listed. The magazine ranked the school 90th in 2008 out of 316 schools. The school was also ranked 103rd in the magazine's September 2006 issue, which surveyed 316 schools across the state. Schooldigger.com ranked the school tied for 175th out of 381 public high schools statewide in its 2011 rankings (a decrease of 37 positions from the 2010 ranking) which were based on the combined percentage of students classified as proficient or above proficient on the mathematics (81.1%) and language arts literacy (92.5%) components of the High School Proficiency Assessment (HSPA).

In its listing of "America's Best High Schools 2016", the school was ranked 226th out of 500 best high schools in the country; it was ranked 36th among all high schools in New Jersey and 19th among the state's non-magnet schools.

In its 2013 report on "America's Best High Schools", The Daily Beast ranked the school 675th in the nation among participating public high schools and 52nd among schools in New Jersey.

Athletics
The Allentown High School Redbirds compete in the Colonial Valley Conference, which is comprised of public and private high schools located in Mercer, Middlesex and Monmouth counties, operating under the supervision of the New Jersey State Interscholastic Athletic Association (NJSIAA). With 824 students in grades 10-12, the school was classified by the NJSIAA for the 2022–24 school years as Group III Central for most athletic competition purposes. The football team competes in the Valley Division of the 94-team West Jersey Football League superconference and was classified by the NJSIAA as Group III South for football for 2022–2024.

The school participates in joint cooperative ice hockey and boys / girls swimming teams with Robbinsville High School as the host school / lead agency. These co-op programs operate under agreements scheduled to expire at the end of the 2023–24 school year.

The girls' field hockey team won the Central Jersey Group II state sectional championship in 1997, 2003, 2004 and 2005, and won the Central Jersey Group III title in 2013. The team was Group II co-champion in 1997 with West Essex High School. Against a  program that had won eight previous state titles, the 1997 team stayed even with West Essex at 2-2 after regulation and three overtime periods to be declared as co-champion in Group II and finish the season with a 14-game unbeaten streak and a 22-1-1 record. The 2003 field hockey won the Central, Group II sectional championship, edging Shore Regional High School 3–2 in the tournament final. The 2004 team repeated the championship, defeating Cinnaminson High School 2–0.

The 2003 girls' tennis team won the Central, Group II title with a 3–2 win over Shore Regional High School.

In 2006, the girls' softball won the Central, Group II sectional championship over John F. Kennedy Memorial High School, by a 3–0 final score. The team moved on to finish the season with a record of 23-4 after winning the NJSIAA Group II state championship, topping Pascack Valley High School in the finals by a score of 11–1 in five innings, under the mercy rule.

The baseball team won the Group II state championship in 2008 (defeating runner-up Mahwah High School in the playoff finals) and won the Group III title in 2017 (vs. Cranford High School). The 2008 team won the Group II title with an 1106 win against Mahwah in the championship game.

The boys soccer team won the Group III state title in 2013 as co-champion with Northern Highlands Regional High School.

The football team won the Central Jersey Group IV state sectional championship in 2016. Allentown defeated Brick Township High School by a score of 41–6 in the tournament final against Brick Township High School. The 2010 football team won the program's first division title, finishing with a record of 6–4. Their biggest win in school history at the time, which also happened in this season, came from defeating Trenton Central High School, the final score was 74–44. In 2015, the football team broke the school record for points in a game, defeating West Windsor-Plainsboro High School North by 81–56, in a game in which quarterback Jordan Winston had 354 rushing yards on 24 carries, and went 4 for 6 for 93 yards. In 2016 the team won the program's first championship, winning the Central Jersey Group IV state sectional title with a 41–6 win against Brick Township High School in the tournament final.

In 2017, the girls' soccer team went 22–1, winning the Central Jersey Group III state sectional championship, the program's first, over Toms River High School East by a score of 2–1. They then went on to win the Group III state title over Middletown High School South in the playoff finals by a score of 2–1. These state titles are the first and only in the girls' soccer program at the high school. The team was also named Area Team of the Year by NJ.com.

In 2018, the NJSIAA sanctioned girls wrestling and state championships were held in 2019. Jasmine Aizley, the first and only female wrestler on the team, qualified in the inaugural 2018-2019 and also the 2019–2020 seasons, her junior and senior year. She was the team's first female captain, region finalist and champion, and placed fourth and second in the state championships.

Student life
The classes feature block scheduling. The third block is split into four lunch periods.

After paying a fee, eleventh and twelfth grade students are given the privilege to drive their cars to school and park in assigned spots. Twelfth grade students park in the parking lot at the back of the school, while eleventh grade students park their cars at the adjoining Byron Johnson Recreation Area parking lot.

Extracurricular activities

Marching band
The Allentown High School marching band has received recognition over the years, including winners of the 2000, 2003, 2008 and 2009 USSBA marching band All-State Finals competitions. The percussion section of the band has won the award for Best Percussion at All-State Finals in 2007, 2008, 2009, 2014, and 2015. The band has gone on to winning many other awards and appearances, such as the St. Patrick's Day Parade on New York City's Fifth Avenue. The band enjoyed back-to-back victories in New York in 1990 and 1991, then five in a row from 1999 to 2003. Meanwhile, the band repeated their performance in Philadelphia's parade, winning in 1990–93, 1999–2000, and 2005–06.

FIRST Robotics Team
Allentown High School is home to FIRST Robotics Competition Team 1807, Redbird Robotics. Since its rookie year in 2006, Redbird Robotics has accepted such honors as the 2006 New Jersey Star Award, the 2007 Regional Motorola Quality Award, and the 2009 New York City Regional Underwriters Laboratory Safety Award and Regional Champion. The team also qualified for and attended the 2006 and 2009 FIRST Championship in Atlanta. In 2017, Redbird Robotics won the FIRST Robotics Mid-Atlantic Regional Competition. As a result, the team moved forward to the World Championships in St. Louis, Missouri.

Administration
From 1999 to 2022, the principal was Constance DeNicola Embley. Todd Pae succeeded her as the current principal on Aug. 1, 2022.  His administration team includes two vice principals.

Notable alumni
 Irwin Lachman (born 1930), one of the inventors of the catalytic converter.
 Ross Scheuerman (born 1993), running back for the Hamilton Tiger-Cats of the Canadian Football League.

References

External links
Allentown High School
Upper Freehold Regional School District

Upper Freehold Regional School District, National Center for Education Statistics

Allentown, New Jersey
Millstone Township, New Jersey
Upper Freehold Township, New Jersey

Middle States Commission on Secondary Schools
Public high schools in Monmouth County, New Jersey